Neelam Shirke is an actress of Marathi language television and Marathi cinema, known for her work in serials on Zee Marathi like Vadalvat, Asambhav and Saheb, Bibi aani Mi. She also works in Marathi theatre. She is also known face on Marathi television channels like Mi Marathi, Star Pravah, DD Sahyadri and ETV Marathi.

Career
She started her career with Marathi one-act plays since her college days, then turning to commercial plays and then gradually to television serials, weekly and daily soaps and then also worked in Marathi cinema. She earned popularity with the successful movie Pachadlela. She is particularly well known for her double character as the scheming vamp Sulekha who is the reincarnation of a prostitute Indumati in the Marathi serial Asambhav. She is also known for her role of Vishakha in Marathi serial Vadalwaat (2003–2007) and that of Bhakti in the Marathi Comedy serial Saheb Bibi aani Me (2004–2006) where she played role of Bharat Jadhav's wife. She also portrayed an important role of Shivaji's queen Soirabai in Raja Shivachatrapati and a positive lead role in Charchaughi serial on Star Pravah. She also appeared in the films Zhak Marli Baiko Keli and Chingi, which earned her critical acclaim.

Filmography
Gadbad Gondhal (2018)
Tendulkar Out (2013)
Dhating Dhingana (2013)
Pratisaad - The Response (2010)
Zhak Marli Bayko Keli (2009)
Chingi (2009)
Ekda Kay Zale Bayko Udali Bhurr (2008) 

Kshan (2006)
Pachadlela (2004)

Television
Saheb Bibi aani Mi
Vadalvaat
Asambhav
Raja Shivchatrapati
Chaar Choughi
Koparkhali
Hasa Chakat Fu
Namaskar Mandali
Advocate Shalini
Swamini

Awards

Zee Marathi Utsav Natyancha Awards
2004: Best Vamp, Role: Vishakha (Vadalvaat)
2005: Best Supporting Actress, Role: Vishakha (Vadalvaat)
2007: Best Vamp, Role: Sulekha (Asambhav)
2008: Best Vamp, Role: Sulekha (Asambhav)
2009: Best Vamp, Role: Sulekha (Asambhav)

References

External links
 

Actresses in Marathi cinema
Marathi people
Living people
21st-century Indian actresses
Year of birth missing (living people)